Mali Bošnjak (meaning "Little Bosniak") is a village in Serbia. It is situated in the Koceljeva municipality, in the Mačva District of Central Serbia. The village had a Serb ethnic majority and a population of 300 in 2002.

Historical population

1948: 555
1953: 576
1961: 536
1971: 478
1981: 401
1991: 368
2002: 300

References

See also

List of places in Serbia

Populated places in Mačva District